Batsara Strict Nature Reserve is a protected area in Akhmeta Municipality, Kakheti region of Georgia in Pankisi Gorge on the bank of Alazani River, 700–2,000 meters  above sea level  at the foot of the Greater Caucasus. It borders with Ilto Managed Reserve which  includes part of Ilto valley.

History 
Batsara State Nature Reserve was first created in 1935 in river Batsara gorge, the right tributary of river Alazani.

Batsara Strict Nature Reserve  is part of Batsara-Babaneuri Protected Areas which also includes Babaneuri Strict Nature Reserve and Ilto Managed Reserve.

Flora 
In central area of Batsara gorge there are remains of relict dendroflora from tertiary period. About 270 ha is covered with yew (Taxus baccata) forests, which is the largest yew forest in the world.
Yew grows as a separate grove, and interspersed with maple, ash, linden and other trees.

Fauna 
Large variety of birds — vultures , eagles , grouse —  are  preserved in grove.
A variety of mammals also live here: bears , chamois , foxes , roe deer , rabbits, martens, badgers and others.

See also 
Ilto Managed Reserve
Taxus baccata

References 

National parks of Georgia (country)
Protected areas established in 2003
Geography of Kakheti
2003 establishments in Georgia (country)